The 2020 PNGNRL Digicel Cup season will be the 30th season of professional rugby league in Papua New Guinea.

2020 season 

The season commenced on 5 July and ended on 18 October. In the Grand Final, Hela Wigmen defeated Lae Snax Tigers 16–14.

Teams

Ladder

References

Sources 

 http://websites.sportstg.com/comp_info.cgi?a=ROUND&round=3&client=0-11722-0-526935-0

2020 in Papua New Guinea rugby league
2020 in Papua New Guinean sport
2020 in rugby league